The New Tempe Arena is a proposed sports facility to be constructed in Tempe, Arizona.  If approved by City of Tempe voters on May 16, 2023, it would serve as home arena for the Arizona Coyotes of the National Hockey League (NHL).  This would be part of the $1.7 billion Tempe Entertainment District. The proposal also includes hotels, retail, apartments, and a theater.

Design
After years of informal negotiations between City of Tempe Economic Development Manager Maria Laughner and Arizona Coyotes management, the Coyotes proposed a 16,000-seat arena that would be located on a parcel of city owned land adjacent to the Salt River.  The site contains 1.5 million tons of landfill material, including potentially hazardous waste that would have to be remediated before an arena could be built.  Tempe would also have to move its municipal maintenance and storage facility currently on the site.

History
On June 2nd, 2022 the Tempe City Council voted 5 to 2 to begin formal negotiations with the Coyotes, with a final agreement at least several months later.  The City of Phoenix implied that litigation over development around the arena is likely if Tempe approves the development the Coyotes proposed.  The FAA would have to approve all building heights and locations, as the proposed arena is directly under the centerline of runway 7L/25R.  The Coyotes are also seeking city sales tax revenues and a 30 year waiver of property taxes to help pay for $200 million in additional costs, including infrastructure work.

Concerns
Due to the site location, Phoenix Sky Harbor International Airport officials have expressed concerns that the Tempe Entertainment District will cause a risk for inbound and outbound aircraft. Phoenix is also concerned that residential uses would occur within the 65db contour, violating a 1994 intergovernmental agreement between Tempe and Phoenix. In 2001, a similar roadblock prevented the Arizona Cardinals from building a stadium near Rio Salado Parkway, which resulted in them moving to Glendale in 2006.

References

Proposed indoor arenas in the United States
Arizona Coyotes